Ruggero Lenci (born Rome, January 7, 1955) is an Italian architect and Professor of Architectural Design at the Faculty of Civil and Industrial Engineering of the Sapienza University of Rome.

Author and director of the Editorial Series "Sustainable Architecture" Gangemi, has collaborated in the writing of entries for the Italian Enciclopedia Treccani: John M. Johansen, I.M. Pei, Paolo Soleri, Bruno Zevi.
His theoretical contribution on "Evolution and architecture between science and design" makes a parallel of scientific disciplines and design ones, from which is derived the following: "The morphogenesis of the project summarizes the history of architecture."
Among his major contributions: the design of an experimental housing unit built in Favaro Veneto (Venice) following the award at the "Europan 1" competition (1989); four researches on the "Roman Architectural School" that have produced as many monographs on "Studio Passarelli" (2006), "Pietro Barucci" (2009), the "Casa del Girasole" by Luigi Moretti (2012 ), the Torre Eurosky by Franco Purini and Laura Thermes (2014); designs on the “housing unit” that produced projects (developed in 1989) in Rome, Bergamo, Bologna, Venice, Florence, Bo island - Sweden; the school projects collected in the books "Didactic and Architecture - Theses in Architectural Design" (2007), "Mutations Laurentino 38 - ontogeny and phylogeny of a Roman neighborhood" (2011), "Sustainable Housing, genetic mutations in Tor Bella Monaca" (2019); the essay "The linguistic acquisitions of contemporary architecture between content and expression" (1989).

Main publications

Books
Archigenesi, Timia Editions, Rome 2022, 
The Flaminio Project as a research product, (preface Umberto Vattani, introduction Laura Thermes), Editor Gangemi, Rome 2022, 
Engineers-Architects of the Roman School of Architecture, (preface by Franco Purini, introduction by Alessandra Muntoni), Editor Gangemi, Rome, 2021, 
The enigma of the housing unit, between theory and design research, Gangemi, Rome 2020, 
One hundred five questions to Pietro Barucci, (by R. Lenci), CLEAN, Naples 2020, 
Vultus Urbis, Gangemi, Rome 2020, 
Sustainable Housing, genetic mutations in Tor Bella Monaca, second edition, Gangemi, Rome 2019. .
The enigma of the Polygonal work with Concave Blocks and the survey of the Walls of Amelia, (with others), second edition, Gangemi, Rome 2018. .
Roma, crisi del progetto e della civitas, (with other curators) Ingramspark, 2017. .
The adventure of a Hermit Crab; fourth edition, 2015. . Narrative for children (languages: Italian, English, French).
The enigma of Torre Eurosky, Gangemi, Rome 2014. .
The Europe's Become, Gangemi, Rome 2013. .
The Roman Summer of Renato Nicolini, Gangemi, Rome 2013. .
The enigma of the Sunflower, Gangemi, Rome 2012. .
Mutations Laurentino 38 - Ontogeny and phylogeny of a Roman neighborhood, Prospettive, Rome 2011. .
Dynamic Morphemes, Prospettive, Rome 2011. .
Pietro Barucci Architetto, Electa, Milan 2009. .
Evolution and Architecture between science and design, Prospettive, Roma 2008. .
Didactic and Architecture - Theses in Architectural Design, Prospettive, Rome 2007. .
Studio Passarelli – one tundre years, one tundre projects, Electa, Milan 2006. .
Lenci Valentin – Theorematic architecture, Mancosu, Rome 2005. .
I.M. Pei - spatial theoremes, - Testo & Immagine, Turin 2004. .
Sergio Lenci - l'Opera Architettonica 1950-2000,(edited by), Diagonale, Rome 2000. .
Manzone Architetto, Gangemi, Rome 1997. .
Massimiliano Fuksas, Testo & Immagine, Turin 1996. .

Critical essays and reviews
Architecture
Mario Antonio Arnaboldi, Pietro Barucci, Massimo Bilò, Tullio Bucciarelli, Cesare Burdese, Enzo Cartapati, Paolo Cavallari, Paolo Colarossi, Claudia Conforti, Roberto De Rubertis, Alessandra Muntoni, Lucio Passarelli, I.M. Pei, Elio Piroddi, Luigi Prestinenza Puglisi, Giuseppe Pullara, Franco Purini, Marcello Rebecchini, Sara Rossi, Adele Naudé Santos, Franco Storelli, Alfonso Testa, Bruno Zevi.
Art
Nicoletta Agostini, Giovanni Faccenda, Giancarlo Galdi, Guido Moretti, Elisabetta Nardiello, Giorgio Palumbi, I.M. Pei, Maria Claudia Simotti, Franco Purini, Maurizio Vitta, Bruno Zevi.

Patents
Ruggero Lenci appears in the List of Italian inventors to have patented the industrial invention known as the Parking sensors. The application was submitted in Rome, Italy, at the Ministry of Industry on December 13, 1984 by Massimo Ciccarello and Ruggero Lenci, and the patent n. 1196650, was released on  November 16, 1988.

References 

1955 births
Living people
20th-century Italian architects
21st-century Italian architects
Academic staff of the Sapienza University of Rome